MindMup is a mind mapping application written primarily in JavaScript and designed to run in HTML5 browsers. It can also be used to create argument maps and concept maps. MindMup v1 was released under an MIT-like license with a non-compete clause that restricts use, which makes it non-free software. The source code is available from GitHub. On 1 January 2017, the project was discontinued. Current version of the site software is not opensource, and there are no plans to opensource it.

References 

Mind-mapping software
Concept- and mind-mapping software for Linux
2013 software